Statistics of Belgian League in season 1987–88.

Overview

It was contested by 18 teams, and Club Brugge K.V. won the championship, while K.A.A. Gent & Racing Jet de Bruxelles were relegated.

League standings

Results

Topscorers

References

Belgian Pro League seasons
Belgian
1